Donald Raleigh may refer to:

 Donald Raleigh (historian), American historian
 Donald Raleigh (politician) (born 1965), American politician

See also
 Don Raleigh